Christophe Plé (born 29 April 1966) is a French former alpine skier who competed in the 1988 Winter Olympics and 1994 Winter Olympics.

References

External links
 sports-reference.com

1966 births
Living people
French male alpine skiers
Olympic alpine skiers of France
Alpine skiers at the 1988 Winter Olympics
Alpine skiers at the 1994 Winter Olympics